The Adventures of the Black Stallion is a  drama television series that starred Mickey Rooney and Richard Ian Cox, as a trainer and a teenaged horse racer and was loosely based on the book series by Walter Farley. The series originally ran on The Family Channel and YTV from September 15, 1990, to May 16, 1993, before cancellation. It has since been shown in re-runs throughout the world. Mickey Rooney is the only original cast member from The Black Stallion to reprise his role in the show. In France, the show ran on M6 from April 20, 1991.

Most of the episodes are set around Canada. During the second and third season, the show moves away from the farm, and has many episodes set in New Zealand, Paris and the United States. The Adventures of The Black Stallion was filmed on location in British Columbia, Canada, as well as France and New Zealand. 16 horses portrayed The Black across the three countries.

Synopsis
The show follows the life of fifteen-year-old horse racer Alec Ramsay (Richard Ian Cox), his wild stallion The Black, and their trainer Henry Dailey (Mickey Rooney). In the series, Alec's father died before the series start, leaving Alec and his mother to run Hopeful Farm. The show focuses both on life at Hopeful Farm and on the racing circuit. During the first season, most of the races are unprofessional circuit races and match races because The Black's an unpapered horse, meaning there is no proof of his lineage. During the second season, The Black's history is uncovered and Alec is able to obtain his papers, allowing him to be raced on the professional circuits around the world.

The series maintained that Alec was the only one who can ride The Black. He is known for having a violent temper with anyone besides Alec, though he does allow some people around the farm to hold his halter and lead him around, most notably Henry. He only seems to do grudgingly, however, and tends to be far less tolerant of others if Alec isn't around to keep him under control. To help keep the high-strung horse calm at the track, the gelding Napoleon is frequently taken on the road with them.

Characters
 Mickey Rooney as Henry Dailey
 Richard Ian Cox as Alec Ramsay
 Marian Filali as Nicole Berthier (Season 2 - Season 3)
 Michele Goodger as Belle Ramsey (Season 1)
 Virginie Demians as Catherine Varnier (Season 1)
 Jean-Paul Solal as Pierre Chastel (Season 1)
 David Taylor as Nathaniel 'Nate' MacKay (Season 3)
 Docs Keepin Time as The Black

Reception
In 1991, the series was nominated for a Young Artist Award in the "Best Off-Prime Time or Cable Family Series" category, and while it lost to Harry and the Hendersons, Richard Ian Cox won the award for the "Best Young Actor Starring in an Off-Prime Time or Cable Family Series" category. Cox was nominated again in 1992 for the "Best Young Actor Starring in a Cable Series" category. In the same year, Mickey Rooney was nominated for a Gemini Award in the category of "Best Performance by an Actor in a Continuing Leading Dramatic Role" for his portrayal of Henry Dailey.

Episode list
When the show was first aired, many of the episodes were shown out of production order, especially during the first season.

Season 1: 1990–1991

Season 2: 1991–1992

Season 3: 1992–1993

Other media

Film
Other theatrical films, The Black Stallion (1979), The Black Stallion Returns (1983), and The Young Black Stallion (2003) were also based on Farley's book series.

DVD releases
Echo Bridge Entertainment released all three seasons on DVD in Region 1 in 2006, 2007, and 2008. These releases contain the episodes arranged in production order instead of air date.

Alliance Home Entertainment has released all three seasons on DVD in Canada.

References
General
 

Specific

External links
 

1990s Canadian drama television series
1990 Canadian television series debuts
1993 Canadian television series endings
1990 French television series debuts
1990 New Zealand television series debuts
1993 French television series endings
1993 New Zealand television series endings
Family Channel (Canadian TV network) original programming
Television series about horses
Television series about teenagers